Gmina Rogowo may refer to either of the following rural administrative districts in Kuyavian-Pomeranian Voivodeship, Poland:
Gmina Rogowo, Rypin County
Gmina Rogowo, Żnin County